Kenning is a circumlocution used instead of an ordinary noun in Old Norse and later Icelandic poetry.

Kenning may also refer to:

 Kenning (unit), an obsolete unit of dry measure in the Imperial system
Kenning River, a tributary of the Case River in Canada

People with the surname Kenning or Kennings:

 Ethan Kenning (born 1943), American rock musician
 Tony Kenning, Def Leppard's original drummer
 Kodee Kennings, fictional girl
 Sir George Kenning, Derbyshire (UK) entrepreneur in the motor trade

See also
 Ken (disambiguation)